"Money to Blow" is the third single from rapper Birdman’s fourth studio album, Priceless. The song features Young Money/Cash Money artists Drake and Lil Wayne. The song - leaked in early 2008 - was originally by Drake, but he went on to give it to Birdman. There is a "sequel" to this song, entitled "4 My Town (Play Ball)", the fourth single from Birdman's album.

Music video
The music video was directed by Gil Green and released on September 25, 2009. It includes cameo appearances by Jay Sean, Currensy, Busta Rhymes, Brisco, Rocko, Young Money artists Lil Chuckee, Lil Twist, Gudda Gudda, Jae Millz, T-Streets and Dre. It was produced by Drumma Boy.

CD track listing

 Money to Blow (Clean) (4:21)
 Money to Blow (Street) (4:22)
 Money to Blow (Instrumental) (4:21)
 Money to Blow (Clean Acapella) (4:20)
 Money to Blow (Street Acapella) 4:22

Versions
 Money to Blow by Drake feat. Twista & Lil Wayne
 Money to Blow by Drake feat. Rocko & Lil Wayne
 Money To Blow by Drake feat. Lil Scrappy & Lil Wayne

Charts

Weekly charts

Year-end charts

References 

2009 singles
Birdman (rapper) songs
Lil Wayne songs
Drake (musician) songs
Song recordings produced by Drumma Boy
Songs written by Lil Wayne
Songs written by Drake (musician)
Cash Money Records singles
Music videos directed by Gil Green
Songs written by Birdman (rapper)
2009 songs